The space-cadet keyboard is a keyboard designed by John L. Kulp in 1978 and used on Lisp machines at Massachusetts Institute of Technology (MIT), which inspired several still-current jargon terms in the field of computer science and influenced the design of Emacs. It was inspired by the Knight keyboard, which was developed for the Knight TV system, used with MIT's Incompatible Timesharing System.

Description 
Each group was in a row, thus allowing easy chording, or pressing of several modifier keys; for example,  could be pressed with the fingers of one hand, while the other hand pressed another key.

Many keys had three symbols on them, accessible by means of the shift keys: a letter and a symbol on the top, and a Greek letter on the front. For example, the  key had a "G" and an up-arrow ("↑") on the top, and the Greek letter gamma ("") on the front. By pressing this key with one hand while playing an appropriate "chord" with the other hand on the shift keys, the user could get the following results:

By combining the modifier keys, it is possible to make . This allowed the user to type very complicated mathematical text, and also to have thousands of single-character commands at their disposal. Many users were willing to memorise the command meanings of so many characters if it reduced typing time. This attitude shaped the interface of Emacs; compare the use of the  key in vi, due to the convenient position of the key on the ADM-3A terminal. Other users, however, thought that so many keys were excessive and objected to this design on the grounds that such a keyboard can be difficult to operate.

This keyboard included a  key which had limited application support. It also included four Roman Numeral keys (and ) which allowed for easy interaction with lists of four or fewer choices.

See also 
 Lisp machine
 Symbolics

References

External links 
 Space Cadet: Mike McMahon's discussion of the keyboard, with illustrative pictures and technical documentation
 Jargon File entry on the space-cadet keyboard
 The Lisp keyboards: overview of the space-cadet and other famous Lisp keyboards
 

Computer keyboard types
Lisp (programming language)